The 12419 / 12420 Gomti Express is a Superfast Express train belonging to Indian Railways – Northern Railway zone that runs between Lucknow NR and  in India.

It operates as train number 12419 from Lucknow NR to New Delhi and as train number 12420 in the reverse direction serving the states of Delhi & Uttar Pradesh.

It is named after the Gomti River which flows through Lucknow.

Coaches

The 12419 / 20 Lucknow–New Delhi Gomti Express has 1 AC First Class cum AC 2 tier, 2 AC Chair Car, 12 Second Class seating, 5 General Unreserved & 2 EOG (GENERATOR CAR) coaches. It does not carry a pantry car. This train is running with modern German LHB coach from 8 June 2018

As is customary with most train services in India, coach composition may be amended at the discretion of Indian Railways depending on demand.

Service

The 12419 Lucknow–New Delhi Gomti Express covers the distance of 513 kilometres in 9 hours 5 mins (59.77 km/hr) & in 9 hours 5 mins as 12420 New Delhi–Lucknow Gomti Express (57.53 km/hr).

As the average speed of the train is above , as per Indian Railways rules, its fare includes a Superfast surcharge.

Route and halts

Lucknow NR 
  
  
 Panki Dham

  
  
 
 Shikohabad Junction

Traction

As the entire route is fully electrified, a Ghaziabad-based WAP-7 powers the train for its entire journey.

Timings

12419 Lucknow–New Delhi Gomti Express leaves Lucknow NR on a daily basis at 05:45 hrs IST and reaches New Delhi at 15:00 hrs IST the same day.

12420 New Delhi–Lucknow Gomti Express leaves New Delhi on a daily basis at 12:20 hrs IST and reaches Lucknow NR at 21:25 hrs IST the same day.

Gallery

References 

 https://www.youtube.com/watch?v=W5idlcgY8Yo
 http://ekikrat.in/Gomti-Express
 http://www.newindianexpress.com/nation/Railways-cuts-booking-period-to-60-days/2013/04/26/article1562167.ece
 https://www.flickr.com/photos/50628848@N07/6213304182/
 http://news.oneindia.in/2008/04/20/bomb-presence-info-in-gomti-express-turns-hoax-1208693002.html

External links

Passenger trains originating from Lucknow
Transport in Delhi
Named passenger trains of India
Rail transport in Delhi
Express trains in India